Victorian (1925–1934) was an American Thoroughbred racehorse that was bred in Kentucky. He was bred and raced by Harry P. Whitney and is best known as the winner of the 1928 Preakness Stakes in which he was ridden by future Hall of Fame jockey Sonny Workman.

New owners
In April 1929 the Warm Stable racing partnership of Silas Mason and Arnold Hanger purchased Victorian from Harry Whitney as part of a three-horse deal. A four-year old at the time, he was acquired primarily for breeding purposes. For the Warm Stable, Victorian raced into 1930 under trainer J. Thomas Taylor. Among his wins, he captured the 1929 W. P. Burch Memorial Handicap at Bowie Race Track and in 1930 the Agua Caliente Handicap in Tijuana, Mexico which carried a guaranteed purse of $100,000, an amount second only to that offered to the winner of the Belmont Futurity Stakes.

When his racing career ended, Victorian proved reasonably successful as a sire while standing at Silas Mason's Duntreath Farm in Lexington, Kentucky. His best runners included 1937 Junior Champion Stakes winner Can't Wait, and the 1936 Santa Anita Derby winner He Did. Victorian was the broodmare sire of 1948 Kentucky Oaks winner Challe Anne.[4] His stud career was cut short when he died on July 30, 1934 from an intestinal obstruction having sired less than three full crops.

Breeding

References

External links
 Pedigree for Victorian

1925 racehorse births
1934 racehorse deaths
Racehorses bred in Kentucky
Racehorses trained in the United States
Preakness Stakes winners
Thoroughbred family 21-a